Ghazi Mohammed Amin Al-Rayes (born August 23, 1935) is a retired Kuwaiti ambassador.

Career
From 1967 to 1970 he was Chairman of the Institute Affairs Section in the Ministry of Foreign Affairs .
From 1970 to 1973 he was Counsellor at the Kuwaiti Embassy in Beirut .
From 1974 to 1980 he was Ambassador in Manama (Bahrain).
From 12 Feb. 1981 to 1993 he was ambassador in London (United Kingdom)
From  to 1996 he was ambassador in Beijing. (China)
From 1996-1998 he was head of diplomatic protocol for the Ministry of Foreign Affairs (Kuwait)
From 1998 to 2002 he was Ambassador in Rome (Italy).

References

1935 births
Living people
Ambassadors of Kuwait to Bahrain
Ambassadors of Kuwait to the United Kingdom
Ambassadors of Kuwait to China
Ambassadors of Kuwait to Italy